Hannah Rickards (born 1979) is a British artist. She has won the Max Mara Art Prize for Women and the Philip Leverhulme Prize in Visual and Performing Arts.

Life and work
Rickards was born in London. She studied at Central Saint Martins and now teaches there.

Publications
To enable me to fix my attention on any one of these symbols I was to imagine that I was looking at the colours as I might see them on a moving picture screen. Oxford: Modern Art Oxford, 2014. By Paul Hobson, Sally Shaw, Isla Leaver-Yap, Rickards, and Adam Chodzko.
Grey light. Left and right back, high up, two small windows. Sternberg/Fogo Island Arts, 2016. By Melissa Gronlund, Will Holder, Alexandra McIntosh, Nicolaus Schafhausen, and Rickards.

Awards
2009: Max Mara Art Prize for Women
2015: Philip Leverhulme Prize in Visual and Performing Arts

Exhibitions
MaxMara Art Prize for Women: Hannah Rickards: No, there was no red, Whitechapel Gallery, London, 2009
To enable me to fix my attention on any one of these symbols I was to imagine that I was looking at the colours as I might see them on a moving picture screen., Modern Art Oxford, Oxford, 2014
Modern Art Oxford, Oxford, 2016

References

External links

Alumni of Saint Martin's School of Art
Artists from London
English women artists
Living people
1979 births
Academics of Central Saint Martins
21st-century English artists
21st-century British women artists
21st-century English women